Thamnolecania is a genus of lichenized fungi in the family Ramalinaceae.

References

Ramalinaceae
Lichen genera
Lecanorales genera
Taxa named by Edvard August Vainio